West Canberra Wanderers Football Club, previously known as Woden-Weston FC is a semi-professional football club based in Canberra, Australia. The club currently competes in the National Premier Leagues Capital Football.

West Canberra Wanderers FC field teams in Junior and senior (adult) men's and women's National Premier League competitions in the ACT. The club has historic links to the community clubs Woden Valley Football Club and Weston-Molonglo Football Club.

History

Weston Molonglo FC (formally Weston Creek Soccer Club), founded in 1971, competed in the ACT Premier League from 1992 to 2002 when the club dropped out of the top level of men's football in the ACT due to the retirements of Warren Barsley and James Lee from presidency and senior men's chair respectively.

Woden Valley FC was formed in 2007 to distinguish itself as a senior club from junior club Woden Valley SC (formed in 1989), and participated in the ACT Premier League and later the National Premier League: Capital Football until 2014.

In late 2014, then Woden Valley FC President John Brooks approached Weston-Molonglo FC men's chair Chris Webb to discuss the possibility of a merged entity to enter the NPL and women's Premier League.  

Woden-Weston FC was incorporated in November 2014 with the intention to merge the elite levels of Woden Valley FC and Weston Molonglo FC into one club to compete in the 2015 National Premier League: Capital Football and beyond.

20 February 2015, the new merged club was officially launched as Woden-Weston FC at the Woden Tradies Club, with the two regional ACT clubs, together fielding combined teams in the NPL and women's premier league from u12's through to seniors, however the community league sides (both junior and senior)  remained under the separate control of the two community clubs: Weston-Molonglo FC and Woden Valley SC.

The new merged club adopted the colours from both clubs with the black from Weston-Molonglo and Red from Woden Valley picked to form the new strip. The strip has been compared to the Western Sydney Wanderers home strip with red and black hoops. The inaugural manager appointed to the men's NPL team was former Canberra FC coach Miro Trninic while the women's PL inaugural manager was long-time Weston-Molonglo coach Pat Mills. The inaugural club technical director was 'Rockin' Rod Lyons.

By the end of 2016, due to various differences between Woden Valley FC and Woden-Weston FC, the clubs agreed to separate, becoming their own entities again.

2015 Inaugural season

On 12 April 2015, Woden-Weston FC took to the field away from home for their maiden men's first grade ACT NPL match against Tigers FC relinquishing a one-goal lead to lose narrowly 2-1.

On 24 April 2015, Woden-Weston played their inaugural home match at Woden Park against Tuggeranong United in what was billed as the Southside derby and was the inaugural match for the Mount Taylor Cup. Under the flood-lights the Woden-Weston boys secured an historic first victory for the club in a crushing 4–0 victory. Both Pepe Varga and Tim Anderson scored braces in the match, enabling the players to lift the newly created Mount Taylor Cup.

2016 season

On 2 November 2015, Woden Weston FC appointed Martin Lategui as men's head coach along with a number of other coaching appointments for the 2016 season.

On 13 May 2016, after five matches in charge, Martin Lategui quit as head coach of Woden-Weston. Club president, Steve Rohan-Jones stressed philosophical differences on how the first team is run was the main reason for the split. Technical Director Rey Castro was appointed interim Head Coach for the remainder of the 2016 season.

While only the club's second season this was a fairly successful season, with the clubs NPL u/13s winning the grandfinal to clinch the championship.

2017 season

4 October 2016, Woden Weston appointed Tony Olivera as the club's new men's first team Head Coach as well as a list of new coaching staff for the 2017 NPL season. Long time Woden Valley coaches

2018 season

27 November 2017, Woden Weston FC appointed El Salvadoran born Rey Castro as the club's Head Coach and Technical Director. Castro had previously managed a young Wanderers Men's 1st grade on interim basis in 2016 (managing 2 wins and a draw in 12 games). As announced in Woden - Weston FC's Facebook page, Rey Castro's appointment as a Head Coach is a continuing football strategy from Wanderers officials to consolidate a pathway to NPL football for youth (women and men) in the region. Castro has been part of Wanderer's coaching staff for the previous two seasons as Technical Director.

Club facilities

Woden-Weston FC play home fixtures at the newly redeveloped Woden Park facility (co-shared with ACT Little Athletics ) and Melrose Enclosed (Pearce 1). These are redeveloped facilities that have been officially re-opened/opened on 14 February 2015 and 9 March 2017 respectively.

Players

Inaugural squad

After the merger and with the departure of previous Woden Valley FC head coach Mitch Stevens and Weston-Molonglo FC head coach Graeme Plath, only six players returned from the Woden Valley team that competed in the 2014 ACTPL and three players from the 2014 Premiership winning Weston-Molonglo FC Capital League side. The new squad for 2015 saw a number of players drafted in from Canberra City (who dropped out of the NPL) and Monaro Panthers.

The long term plan for the club is to develop youth products and bring them through the youth ranks into the senior elite setup. The major challenge for the club that has a youth pool of over 3,500 players to draw from is to retain the best players once they graduate to first team football as traditionally both the community clubs struggled to compete financially with some of the other NPL clubs in the ACT when previously participating in the first grade.

Current squad

Current NPL Squad as of 31 March 2019.

Coaching staff

Current staff

Current as of 1 January 2018

Men

Women

Men's head coach history

(*) – Denotes interim manager

Club management

Current as of 4 April 2017

Season-by-season results

The below table is updated with the statistics and final results for Woden-Weston FC following the conclusion of each National Premier League Capital Football season.

References

External links

Official club website
NPL club website
Capital Football Home
Woden-Weston FC ACT NPL Fixtures
Woden-Weston FC ACT NPL Results
ACT NPL News

National Premier Leagues clubs
Soccer clubs in Canberra
Association football clubs established in 2015
2015 establishments in Australia